Hafalan Shalat Delisa (Delisa's Salat Recitation) is 2011 Indonesian drama film which was released on December 22, 2011. Directed by Sony Gaokasak and starring Nirina Zubir and Reza Rahadian, the film is based on the best-selling fiction novel by Tere Liye with the same title. It also based on 2004 Tsunami Disaster.The whole film was shot in Aceh.

Plot
Delisa (Chantiq Schagerl), as a common little girl, had a wonderful life in Lhok Nga, a small village located on the coast of Aceh. She was the youngest daughter of Abi Usman (Reza Rahadian) family, her father served in a tanker ship for an international oil company. Delisa was very close to her mother, who she called Ummi (Nirina Zubir), and her three sisters; Fatima (Ghina Salsabila) and the twins Aisyah (Reska Tania Apriadi) and Zahra (Riska Tania Apriadi).

On December 26, 2004, Delisa with Ummi was getting to the prayer practice exam when suddenly there was an earthquake. Earthquake that was enough to make Delisa's mom and sisters  fear. Suddenly the tsunami hit, rolled up their small village, rolled up their schools, and Delisa's little body rolled as well as other hundred thousands in various parts of the coast of Aceh, as well as in Southeast Asia.

Delisa survived and was saved by Smith (Mike Lewis), a U.S. Army soldier who became a volunteer, after several days passed out at a rock. Unfortunately, severe injuries make Delisa's right leg amputated. Delisa's suffering attracted more people compassionately. Smith once wanted to adopt her if she is alone, but Abi Usman succeeded to find Delisa. Delisa happily reunites with his father, although sad to hear that her three sisters has gone, while Ummi's status is unknown.

Delisa rose, amid the grief and loss, in the midst of despair that plagued Abi Usman and other Acehnese people, Delisa has been a little angel who shares laughter at each attendance. Although heavy, Delisa has been taught how grief can be a force to stay afloat. Although it seems did not want the tears stopped flowing, but Delisa trying to understand what it is sincere, doing something without expecting a reply.

References

2004 Indian Ocean earthquake and tsunami
Indonesian drama films
2011 films
2010s Indonesian-language films
Films based on Indonesian novels
2011 drama films